Janmejaya Kumar Sinha (born September 12, 1959) is the present chairman of Boston Consulting Group (BCG) India, a BCG fellow and a member of the Henderson Institute Innovation Sounding Board.

Career 
Janmejaya Kumar Sinha is the present chairman of Boston Consulting Group (BCG) India. He is also a member of BCG's Henderson Institute Innovation Sounding Board, which is dedicated to supporting, inspiring and guiding upstream innovation at BCG. He served as Chairman Asia Pacific for BCG from 2009 to 2018. Additionally he has served on the firms executive committee from 2006 to 2018. He has been with BCG since 1998.  Prior to becoming Chairman Asia Pacific, he was Managing Director of the India Practice from 2003 till 2009.   In 2010, Consulting Magazine considered him to be among the 25 most influential consultants in the world. His primary focus is around issues of strategy, corporate governance, and organization for family conglomerates and financial services clients around the world. He is also co-author of two books 'Own the Future:50 Ways to Win from The Boston Consulting Group' and 'Your Strategy Needs A Strategy'.

He is currently Chairman of Confederation of Indian Industry (CII) committee on financial inclusion and digitisation and member of their national council.   He has been a member of numerous committees set up by Government of India, Reserve Bank of India, Indian Banks Association and Confederation of Indian Industry.   He is a regular speaker at the World Economic Forum and also at industry summits of Confederation of Indian Industry, Federation of Indian Chambers of Commerce and Industry, Nasscom, Indian Banks Association. He is often called in on panels as an expert by the electronic media.   He is a regular contributor to the press and has written across all Indian economic dailies Indian Express, The Economic Times, Financial Express, Business Standard, and Mint  around a range of issues around economy and business. In addition to which he has also been asked to chair a number of juries including Forbes' India Leadership awards.

Prior to joining BCG in 1998 he worked with The Reserve Bank of India in Calcutta, Mumbai and Patna in a variety of departments.  His last assignment was managing India's gold reserves during the balance of payments crisis India faced in 1991.

He also serves on several advisory boards advising organisations like, Cyril Amarchand Mangaldas and Murugappa Group.

Education 

He has a Ph.D. from Princeton University's Woodrow Wilson School of Public and International Affairs. His thesis was titled Growing to fail: the political economy of public sector banks' performance in India. In 1984 he won the INLAKS scholarship to pursue a B.A. and an M.A. in economics from Clare College, Cambridge University.  He also has a B.A. and an M.A. in history from St. Stephen's College Delhi University

Awards, honors and publications

 Member of NITI Aayog committee to promote the use of digital payment systems
Member of Advisory Panel on Institutions and Market Structure for RBI. 
Member of Planning Commission's Panel of Experts on Reforms in Central Public Sector Enterprises
Awarded INLAKS scholarship to pursue studies in Cambridge University 1984
Awarded Wilson fellowship in Princeton University 1994
Awarded Diamond Jubilee fellowship By Indian Institute of Bankers to Study gold market 1990
Author 'Own the Future:50 Ways to Win from The Boston Consulting Group'
Author 'Your Strategy Needs A Strategy' published by Harvard Business Review Press

References 

1959 births
Living people
Boston Consulting Group people
St. Stephen's College, Delhi alumni
Princeton School of Public and International Affairs alumni
Alumni of Clare College, Cambridge